The Buffalo River Dene Nation is a Dene First Nations band government in Saskatchewan, Canada. The band's main community, Dillon, is located on the western shore of Peter Pond Lake at the mouth of the Dillon River, and is accessed by Highway 925 from Highway 155.

History 

The North West Company had a post near Dillon in 1790. It was called Lac des Boeufs Post (Buffalo Lake Post). The Hudson's Bay Company had a post nearby in 1791.

In 1819–1820 Sir John Franklin noted the position of the North West Company Post on Buffalo Lake (Peter Pond Lake) where Buffalo River (Dillon River) is located. (see map)

The first post office opened under the name of Buffalo River in 1926 and closed in 1929. In 1954 the post office was re-opened under the name of Dillon.

Name changes 
In 1932 the name of the community was officially changed from Buffalo River to Dillon, the name of the river was changed from Buffalo River to Dillon River and Buffalo Lake was renamed Peter Pond Lake. A lake on the Dillon River just west of Vermette Lake also received its official name of Dillon Lake in 1932.

The source of the Dillon River is in Alberta east of Lake Winefred near co-ordinates .

Buffalo River Dene Nation 
Buffalo River Dene Nation has a total registered membership of 1,273 with 689 members residing on-reserve and 584 members residing at locations off-reserve as of May, 2012  The total territory of the Buffalo River Dene Nation 193 is 8259.70 hectares.

Demographics

See also 
Denesuline language
Denesuline

References 

Dene communities
First Nations governments in Saskatchewan
First Nations in Saskatchewan